The 2011 BCR Open Romania Ladies was a professional tennis tournament played on outdoor clay courts. It was the 5th edition of the tournament which was part of the 2011 ITF Women's Circuit. It took place in Bucharest, Romania between July 18 and July 23, 2011.

Singles entrants

Seeds

 Rankings are as of July 11, 2011.

Other entrants
The following players received wildcards into the singles main draw:
  Elora Dabija
  Cristina Dinu
  Diana Enache
  Cristina Mitu

The following players received entry from the qualifying draw:
  Annalisa Bona
  Estrella Cabeza Candela
  Eva Fernández-Brugués
  Lenka Juríková

The following players received entry as a Lucky loser:
  Laura-Ioana Andrei

Champions

Singles

 Irina-Camelia Begu def.  Laura Pous Tió, 6–3, 7–5.

Doubles

 Irina-Camelia Begu /  Elena Bogdan def.  Maria Elena Camerin /  İpek Şenoğlu, 6–7(1–7), 7–6(7–4), [16–14].

References

External links

Official Website
ITF Search 

2011 ITF Women's Circuit
BCR Open Romania Ladies
2011 in Romanian tennis
2011 in Romanian women's sport